CHJM-FM is a French-language Canadian radio station located in Saint-Georges, Quebec.

Owned and operated by Groupe Radio Simard, it broadcasts on 99.7 MHz using a directional antenna with an average effective radiated power of 100,000 watts (class C1). The station has a CHR/Top 40 format branded as Mix 99,7.

The station received CRTC approval in 1986  and was launched on June 22, 1987, and originally broadcast with the call sign CIRO-FM.

Before its change of call letters, CIRO broadcast a country format. The station was referred to on air as Le FM country du Québec.

References

External links
 Mix 99,7
 
 

Hjm
Hjm
Hjm
Saint-Georges, Quebec
Hjm
Radio stations established in 1987
1987 establishments in Quebec